Arthur C. Clarke's Mysterious World is a thirteen-part British television series looking at unexplained phenomena from around the world. It was produced by Yorkshire Television for the ITV network and first broadcast on 6 September 1980.

Each program is introduced and book-ended by science fiction writer Arthur C. Clarke in short sequences filmed in Sri Lanka. The bulk of the episodes are narrated by Gordon Honeycombe. The series was produced by John Fanshawe and John Fairley, and directed by Peter Jones, Michael Weigall and Charles Flynn. It also featured a unique soundtrack composed by British artist Alan Hawkshaw.

In 1980, Book Club Associates published a hardcover book with the same name, authored by Simon Welfare and John Fairley, where the contents of the show were further explored. It featured an introduction written by Clarke as well as his remarks at the end of each chapter or topic. In 1985, a paperback of this book was released by HarperCollins Publishers.

The series was followed by Arthur C. Clarke's World of Strange Powers in 1985 and Arthur C. Clarke's Mysterious Universe in 1994.

Episodes

Home release
In January 2008 the original series was released on DVD in the UK by Network and Granada. It features all of the 13 original episodes unedited and remastered.

A collection DVD Box Set of all three Arthur C. Clarke documentary series, Arthur C. Clarke's Mysterious World, Arthur C. Clarke's World of Strange Powers and Arthur C. Clarke's Mysterious Universe was released in July 2013 by Visual Entertainment, which also re-released them separately in September 2013.

See also
In Search of... – a television show

References

 Shirlow, R. (2021). Revisiting the mysterious world of Arthur C Clarke. Fortean Times no. 410[Oct.]: 32–39.
 Shirlow, R. (2021). Revisiting Arthur C Clarke's Mysterious World: part 2. Fortean Times no. 411[Nov.]: 42–47.
 Shirlow, R. (2021). Revisiting Arthur C Clarke's Mysterious World: part 3. Fortean Times no. 412[Dec.]: 44–49.

External links
Arthur C. Clarke's Mysterious World

1980 British television series debuts
1980 British television series endings
ITV documentaries
UFO-related television
Paranormal television
Cryptozoological television series
Television series by Arthur C. Clarke
Television series by ITV Studios
Television series by Yorkshire Television
English-language television shows
Discovery Channel original programming